Robert Augustus Gardner Monks  (born December 4, 1933) is an American author, shareholder activist, corporate governance advocate, attorney, corporate director, venture capitalist and energy company executive — as well as former political candidate and Reagan administration official. 
 
Monks co-founded of Institutional Shareholder Services, Lens Investment Management, Lens Governance Advisors and The Corporate Library (now part of GMI Ratings). He authored The Emperor’s Nightmare, Corpocracy, Citizens DisUnited, Reel and Rout: A Novel, The New Global Investors and, with Nell Minow, Watching the Watchers, Corporate Governance and Power & Accountability. 

He was the Republican nominee for the U.S. Senate from Maine in 1976, losing in a landslide to Democratic Senator Edmund Muskie. He again ran for Senate in 1996, but lost that Republican primary to Susan Collins. He also unsuccessfully challenged longtime Republican Senator Margaret Chase Smith in the 1972 Republican primary.

Background
Monks was born on December 4, 1933.  He was the son of Rev. G. Gardner Monks and Katharine Knowles.  Rev. Monks was the founding headmaster of Lenox School for Boys and Canon of the Washington Cathedral. 

A cousin of Monks' grandmother- from whom came his second name- was the politician Augustus Peabody Gardner. Monks was educated at St. Paul's School, Harvard College, Cambridge University and Harvard Law School. At Cambridge, he was a member of the winning Cambridge University Boat Club boat in the 1955 edition of The Boat Race, a traditional competition between Cambridge and Oxford Universities. Monks married Millicent Carnegie Sprague in July 1954.

Monks' lives on an island in Maine with his wife, née Millicent Carnegie Sprague, great-granddaughter of Thomas Carnegie, the younger brother of Andrew Carnegie.

Career

After graduating from law school, Monks became a partner in a law firm in Boston. He was vice president of Gardner Associates and then was president and CEO of C.H. Sprague & Son, a coal and oil Company. Then he was a board member and later chairman of the Board of The Boston Safe Deposit & Trust Company and the Boston Company. Ronald Reagan appointed him as director of the United States Synthetic Fuels Corporation and as one of the founding Trustees of the Federal Employees' Retirement System. He worked for the US Department of Labor as Administrator of the Office of Pension and Welfare Benefit Programs which gave him jurisdiction over the whole U.S. pension system.

Monks has written widely about corporate governance and has published more than a hundred papers in publications around the world. He was the recipient of  the Award for Outstanding Financial Executive from the Financial Management Association in 2007.

Monks is the subject of a biography chronicling the corporate governance movement, A Traitor to His Class by Hilary Rosenberg.

The corporation is an externalizing machine, in the same way that a shark is a killing machine. | Robert Monks (2003) Republican candidate for Senate from Maine and corporate governance adviser in the film The Corporation.

In the above documentary film, Monks was interviewed and featured to address issues of corporations including how their profit models historically involve being "lean, mean, externalizing machines."

Bibliography
Power & Accountability. HarperCollins, 1991. (with Nell Minow)
Watching the Watchers. Capstone, 1996. (with Nell Minow)
The Emperor's Nightingale. Saint Simons Island, Georgia: Brook Street, 1999.
The New Global Investors. Capstone, 2001.
Capitalism Without Owners Will Fail: A Policymaker's Guide to Reform.  London: CSFI, 2002. (with Allen Sykes)
Reel and Rout. Saint Simons Island, Georgia: Brook Street, 2004.
Corpocracy. New York; Wiley, 2007.
Corporate Valuation for Portfolio Investment. London: Wiley, 2010. (with Alexandra Lajoux)
Corporate Governance (5th Revised Edition). London: Wiley, 2011. (with Nell Minow)
Citizens DisUnited: Passive Investors, Drone CEOs, and the Corporate Capture of the American Dream. 2013.

See also
List of Cambridge University Boat Race crews
Nell Minow

References

Hart, Joanne.  "Bob Monks: Ungoverned companies are like doped horses."  (Reach April 2005)
Geraciot, David A.  "Bob Monks' Thirty-year Crusade."  (Registered Rep. February 2003)

External links
Robert Monks' blog

1933 births
American activists
American male rowers
Cambridge University Boat Club rowers
Harvard Law School alumni
Living people
Maine Republicans
Alumni of the University of Cambridge
St. Paul's School (New Hampshire) alumni
Harvard College alumni